Lawrence Calvin Foster III, commonly known as Rusty Foster, is an American media critic and programmer. He is the author of Today in Tabs, the founder of Kuro5hin, and the creator of Scoop, a collaborative media application used by several websites. He also helped develop Scripto, the screenwriting software company founded by Stephen Colbert.

In 2013, his Facebook account was subject to a 'prank' reporting him dead, drawing the attention of a number of major news outlets.

Since 2013, Foster has written occasionally for The New Yorker magazine, including on the Healthcare.gov debacle.

Kuro5hin 

Kuro5hin (K5; read "corrosion") was a collaborative discussion website founded by Rusty Foster in 1999, having been inspired by Slashdot. Around 2005, its membership numbered in the tens of thousands. On May 1, 2016, the site was closed down permanently with all content taken offline.

Today in Tabs 
Over the years, Foster has written an influential news media and Internet culture newsletter called Today in Tabs. Its first iteration, which ran from 2013 to 2016, was syndicated on Fastcolabs and Newsweek and reached about 12,000 subscribers.

He restarted the newsletter in January 2021 on the Substack platform, with a Discord server for subscribers.

Personal life 
Foster currently lives on Peaks Island with his wife and three children.

References

External links
 Foster's user page on Kuro5hin
 Foster's weblog
 Q&A: Rusty Foster at HotelChatter
 Fast Company's profile on Rusty Foster
 Farces Scoop Interview with Rusty
 Rusty Foster's Scoop fell by script kiddies
 JLog: Q&A Rusty Foster
 Rusty Foster on Web Blogs and Journalism at a video interview at Berkeley
 Today in Tabs

American bloggers
Year of birth missing (living people)
Living people
American media critics
American computer programmers